The École militaire ("military school") is a complex of buildings in Paris, France, which house various military training facilities. It was founded in 1750 by King Louis XV and is located in the 7th arrondissement of Paris, southeast of the Champ de Mars.

The building, constructed by Ange-Jacques Gabriel, is an active military academy and is classified as a national monument since 1990. This site can be visited during the European Heritage Days.

History

Origins of the institution 
L'École Militaire was founded in 1750, after the War of the Austrian Succession, by Louis XV on the basis of a proposal of Marshal Maurice de Saxe and with the support of Madame de Pompadour and financier Joseph Paris Duverney.

Previously, military academies were exclusive to children of a noble background and offered apprenticeships in the King's Stables or the stables of other royal members. With the aim of creating an academic college for cadet officers from poor noble families, the exclusivity that royal military academies held vanished.

By the edict of January 1751, King Louis XV founded the institution intended for the education of five hundred noble young men and born without fortune. Article XI of the edict provides for "by way of first perpetual endowment" the tax on playing cards. The administration is entrusted to the Secretary of State for War. The Royal Military Academy included a number of military colleges in the province such as the School of Brienne where students were admitted on evidence of nobility. At the end of their schooling, admission to the Royal Military School in Paris was done through a national competition.

Architecture and Ange-Jacques Gabriel 
Enlisted by the King to design a more grandiose building than the Hôtel des Invalides (constructed by Louis XIV), Ange-Jacques Gabriel began construction in 1752 on the grounds of the farm of Grenelle. After a long period of construction, the school did not open until 1760. Gabriel presented an immense area with beautiful façades and running water through a system of wells and pipes. It was indeed much larger, and striking than the Invalides.

The Comte de Saint-Germain reorganised the establishment in 1777 under the name of the École des Cadets-gentilshommes (School of Young Gentlemen), of which accepted the young Napoleon Bonaparte in 1784. Bonaparte went on to graduate after only one year instead of two.

It now hosts:
 The École de guerre (EdG) (College of Warfare)
 The Ecole de Guerre-Terre (EdG-T)
 The Institut des hautes études de défense nationale (Institute of Advanced Studies in National Defense)

See also
Ecole de Guerre-Terre (EDG-T), Paris
École spéciale militaire de Saint-Cyr (ESM), Coëtquidan, Brittany
 (EdG) (School of Warfare)
École militaire interarmes (EMIA), Coëtquidan, Brittany
École supérieure de guerre (1876 - 1993)

References

External links

 Official website of CID 

Education in Paris
1750 establishments in France
Buildings and structures in Paris
Military academies of France
Buildings and structures in the 7th arrondissement of Paris
Palaces and residences of Napoleon
Educational institutions established in 1750
Terminating vistas in Paris